David Osei Opoku (born 31 January 1992) is a Ghanaian professional footballer who currently plays as a forward for Muaither SC.

Playing career

Youth and college 
Opoku played for Achimota School in Accra, Ghana and trained with Chelsea FC in England before moving to the United States to play college football for the University of California, Santa Barbara.  He spent 2 seasons with the UC Santa Barbara Gauchos men's soccer team and was named the Big West Conference Freshman of the Year in 2010 in addition to being named to the 2010 All-Big West Second Team.  He ended his career with the Gauchos with 15 goals and 7 assists.

Professional 
After a few months of trials, Opoku signed a contract with Finnish Veikkausliiga club Myllykosken Pallo −47 in April 2012.  He played in 13 Veikkausliiga matches with the club, scoring no goals.  He did score in his lone 2012–13 UEFA Europa League appearance on 12 July 2012 against Cefn Druids A.F.C.

Opoku was sent on loan to IF Gnistan, who play in the Finnish Kakkonen, in August 2012 to see out the remainder of his contract where he scored 7 goals in 10 matches.

He joined Iranian club Sanat Mes Kerman F.C. on a short-term deal in March 2014 and recorded one assist during his time with the club.

In Fall 2015, he signed for Lebanese Premier League side Al Egtmaaey Tripoli.

He then joined rivals Tripoli SC the following year.

In the summer of 2017, he signed with Qatar Stars League club Muaither SC.

International 
David was called up to train with the Ghana national under-23 football team in June 2011 when he was still enrolled at UC Santa Barbara.  He appeared in an exhibition against Deportivo FC and scored a goal. He was again called up to camp with the national team in October 2014 and made the trip to Nigeria to play against the Nigerian senior national team in a friendly played in honor of the opening of the  Akwa Ibom international stadium. He made second half appearance in the game and nearly equalized.

Honours

Individual 
 Big West Conference Freshman of the Year: 2010

References

External links
 
 
 David Opoku on HailooSport
 
 UC Santa Barbara player profile

1992 births
Living people
Ghanaian footballers
Ghanaian expatriate footballers
UC Santa Barbara Gauchos men's soccer players
Myllykosken Pallo −47 players
Sanat Mes Kerman F.C. players
Expatriate footballers in Qatar
Muaither SC players
Association football forwards
Expatriate soccer players in the United States
Expatriate footballers in Finland
Expatriate footballers in Iran
Veikkausliiga players
IF Gnistan players
Qatari Second Division players
Ghanaian expatriate sportspeople in Lebanon
Expatriate footballers in Lebanon
Al Egtmaaey SC players
AC Tripoli players
Lebanese Premier League players